The 2013 CIS Women's Volleyball Championship was held February 28, 2013 to March 2, 2013, in Sherbrooke, Quebec, to determine a national champion for the 2012–13 CIS women's volleyball season. The tournament was played at the Univestrie Pavilion at the Université de Sherbrooke. It was the second time that Sherbrooke had hosted the tournament with the first time occurring in 1988.

The gold medal match featured a rematch of the previous year's final, which had not occurred since the 1995 and 1996 games between the Pandas and the Rouge et Or. In this match, the top-seeded UBC Thunderbirds won their sixth consecutive national championship in their 3–0 match victory over the Alberta Pandas. This tied the record for consecutive national championships with the Winnipeg Wesmen (1983-1988) and Alberta Pandas (1995-2000). The Thunderbirds finished the season on a 25-game winning streak and the gold medal win was the program's CIS-leading 10th national championship.

Participating teams

Championship bracket

Consolation bracket

Awards

Championship awards 
CIS Tournament MVP – Lisa Barclay, UBC
R.W. Pugh Fair Play Award – Krista Zubick, Alberta

All-Star Team 
Lisa Barclay, UBC
Shanice Marcelle, UBC
Brina Derksen-Bergen, UBC
Jaki Ellis, Alberta
Amy Ott, Trinity Western
Kelci French, Trinity Western
Karina Krueger Schwanke, Ottawa

References

External links 
 Tournament Web Site

U Sports volleyball
2013 in women's volleyball
Université de Sherbrooke